Mohamed Jufrie bin Mahmood (Jawi: محمد جفرياي بن مهمود) is a Singaporean politician who was a prominent opposition political figure in the country in the 1980s and 1990s, when he stood in elections as a candidate for both the Singapore Democratic Party (SDP) and the Workers' Party. He served as the Chairman of the SDP from 2011 to 2013.

Political career 

At the 1984 general election, Jufrie stood as a candidate for the Workers' Party in the constituency of Kampong Kembangan. He was defeated by Yatiman Yusof of the governing People's Action Party (PAP) by 8,210 votes (44.3%) to 10,326 (55.7%). 

At the 1988 general election, Jufrie stood as a candidate for the SDP in the Aljuined GRC. Jufrie and fellow SDP members Ashleigh Seow and Neo Choon Aik were defeated by the PAP's team by 26,375 votes (43.7%) to 34,020 (56.3%). 

At the 1991 general election, Jufrie stood as a candidate for the Workers' Party in the Eunos GRC. Jufrie came to national prominence during this election campaign after Prime Minister Goh Chok Tong accused him of being a Malay chauvinist because of comments Jufrie made about the role of Malay community in Singapore and his use of the phrase "Insha'Allah" ("God willing") in a campaign speech. Goh urged people not to vote for Jufrie in order to help protect inter-racial harmony in Singapore. Jufrie strongly denied that he was a Malay chauvinist and said that he was merely raising important issues which he felt needed to be addressed. In the end, Jufrie and his fellow Workers' Party members Lee Siew Choh, Neo Choon Aik and Wee Han Kim were narrowly defeated by the PAP's team in Eunos by 41,673 votes (47.6%) to 45,833 (52.4%). 

At the 1997 general election, Jufrie stood as a candidate for the SDP in the Jalan Besar GRC. He and his fellow SDP members David Chew, Gandhi Ambalam and Low Yong Nguan were defeated by the PAP's team by 21,537 votes (32.4%) to 44,840 (67.6%). 

Jufrie was among a group of SDP members charged with participating in an unlawful political assembly on the driveway leading to Parliament House in 2008. He was fined after being found guilty of this offence.

Jufrie was elected the party chairman of the SDP in 2011 and served in this role until 2013.

Personal life
Jufrie had a least one daughter and two sons.

References

Singapore Democratic Party politicians
Workers' Party (Singapore) politicians
1950 births
Living people
Singaporean people of Malay descent
Singaporean Muslims